Michael Evans (3 May 1908 – 14 November 1974) was an English cricketer. Evans was a right-handed batsman who bowled right-arm fast-medium. He was born at Leicester, Leicestershire.

Evans made two first-class appearances for Leicestershire against Surrey and Glamorgan in the 1946 County Championship. In his two matches he scored a total of 26 runs at an average of 8.66, with a high score of 14 not out. With the ball, he took 6 wickets at a bowling average of 21.66, with best figures of 3/30.

He died at the city of his birth on 14 November 1974.

References

External links
Michael Evans at ESPNcricinfo
Michael Evans at CricketArchive

1908 births
1974 deaths
Cricketers from Leicester
English cricketers
Leicestershire cricketers